Rock Steady Crew is an American breaking and hip hop group which has become a franchise name for multiple groups in other locations. The group's 1983 international hit song "(Hey You) The Rock Steady Crew" (from the group's first studio album Ready for Battle) peaked at No. 6 on the UK Singles Chart, and reached the top 10 in many European countries. Members of Rock Steady Crew featured in the films Flashdance and Beat Street, which ignited international interest in the b-boy subculture.

History
The group was initially formed in The Bronx, New York City in 1977 by b-boys Jimmy Dee and Jimmy Lee. The Manhattan branch was created by Crazy Legs and B-Boy Fresh. The New York Times called the Rock Steady Crew "the foremost breakdancing group in the world today."

Notable members

Crazy Legs
DJ Cucumber Slice
DJ Qbert
Fever One
Madchild
Mr. Wiggles
Q-Unique
Rahzel
Tony Touch

Former members
Frosty Freeze
Mix Master Mike
Ken Swift
Rhettmatic
Daisy Castro (a.k.a. Baby Love) - lead vocals on "(Hey You) The Rock Steady Crew"

Discography

Albums
 Ready for Battle (Virgin Records, 1984)
 30 Years to the Day (Truelements Music, 2007)

Singles

Appearances in feature films
 Wild Style (1982)
 Style Wars (1983)
 Flashdance (1983)
 Beat Street (1984)
 Moonwalker (1988)
 Streets Is Watching (1998)

References

Sources
 The Freshest Kids: A History of the B-Boy (DVD), Image Entertainment, 2002.
 Hip-Hop (Korean Comic) (Manhwa), IQ Jump Comics, 1998-2004.

External links
 
 

American breakdancing groups
American hip hop dance groups
Organizations based in New York City
Organizations established in 1979